Sa'ad al-Din (Arabic: سعد الدين), also written Saad Eddine or Saadeddine, is an Arabic name and given name.  People with the name include:

People
 Sa'd al-Din Köpek (died 1240), court administrator under Seljuq Sultans of Rum
 Taftazani (Sa'ad al-Din Masud ibn Umar ibn Abd Allah al-Taftazani, 1322–1390), Persian scholar
 Sa'ad ad-Din II (ruled c. 1400), Somali Sultan of the Ifat Sultanate
 Hoca Sadeddin Efendi (1536–1599), Turkish scholar, official, and historian
 Sa'd al-Din Hu Songshan (1880–1955), Chinese imam and leader of the Yihewani Muslim sect 
 Saad Eddin Ibrahim (born 1938), Egyptian-American sociologist and author
 Saadeddine Othmani (born 1956), Moroccan psychiatrist and politician
 Saad Hariri (Saad ed Deen Rafiq al-Hariri, born 1970), Prime Minister of Lebanon
 Mohamed Saad El Din Sherif (died 1997), Egyptian general

See also
 Saad (disambiguation)
 Saad, a given name
 Saadallah, a given name
 Sad ol Din, a village in Iran
 Sadettin, Turkish version of the name
 Saladin (disambiguation)

Arabic masculine given names